Joe Feeney (born 28 February 1937) is an Irish wrestler. He competed at the 1960 Summer Olympics and the 1964 Summer Olympics.

References

External links
 

1937 births
Living people
Irish male sport wrestlers
Olympic wrestlers of Ireland
Wrestlers at the 1960 Summer Olympics
Wrestlers at the 1964 Summer Olympics
Sportspeople from Dublin (city)
20th-century Irish people